Tasmanicosa is a genus of spiders in the family Lycosidae. It was first described in 1959 by Roewer. , it contains 14 species, all from Australia.

Species
Tasmanicosa comprises the following species:
Tasmanicosa fulgor Framenau & Baehr, 2016
Tasmanicosa gilberta (Hogg, 1906)
Tasmanicosa godeffroyi (L. Koch, 1865)
Tasmanicosa harmsi Framenau & Baehr, 2016
Tasmanicosa hughjackmani Framenau & Baehr, 2016
Tasmanicosa kochorum Framenau & Baehr, 2016
Tasmanicosa leuckartii (Thorell, 1870)
Tasmanicosa musgravei (McKay, 1974)
Tasmanicosa phyllis (Hogg, 1906)
Tasmanicosa ramosa (L. Koch, 1877)
Tasmanicosa salmo Framenau & Baehr, 2016
Tasmanicosa semicincta (L. Koch, 1877)
Tasmanicosa stella Framenau & Baehr, 2016
Tasmanicosa subrufa (Karsch, 1878)

References

Lycosidae
Araneomorphae genera
Spiders of Australia
Taxa named by Carl Friedrich Roewer